De Lint may refer to:

Charles de Lint, a Canadian author
Derek de Lint, a Dutch actor
De Lint (family), a Dutch patrician family.